Música cebolla (Spanish for "onion music") is a genre of Chilean music emphasising sentimentality and intimacy. Indeed at times the feelings expressed in música cebolla are "exacerbated". Música cebolla had its heydays in the 1950s and 1960s, and was thus contemporary to Nueva ola, the early Nueva Canción and the introduction of Cumbia to Chile.

For a long time música cebolla was derided, ridiculed or ignored by mass media. 

Among older generations Palmenia Pizarro is an icon of música cebolla albeit she rejects the label. Palmenia has influenced contemporary música cebolla artist like Mon Laferte  and Los Vásquez.

References

Chilean music
Romance (music)